The Aguamilpa Dam is an embankment dam on the Río Grande de Santiago in the Mexican state of Nayarit,  northeast of Tepic. The primary purpose of the dam is hydroelectric power generation and it supplies a 960 MW power station with water. Construction on the dam began in 1989 and it was completed in 1993 while the power station became operational in 1994.

Background
Funding for the project was supplied by the Mexican Government, World Bank and USD$250 million was invested by several foreign governments. A USD$460 million World Bank loan was approved on 8 June 1989 and covered the Hydroelectric Development Project in Mexico which included the Aguamilpa Dam and the Zimapán Dam. Also included in the Aguamilpa Dam project was the power plant, substations and San Rafael Dam downstream. The dam was constructed by a consortium of engineering companies which included Hydroenergo, Siemens, Voest, ANDRITZ and Technit. In 1993, construction on the dam was complete and its power plant was operational August of the next year. The dam was inaugurated on 21 July 1993 and its total cost was USA$967 million. Approximately 3,000 people were displaced and resettled by the construction of both dams in the Mexico Hydroelectric Development Project.

Design
The power station contains three 320 MW Francis turbine-generators for a total installed capacity of 960 MW. A second phase of the project has yet to be built which includes the installation of two more 320 MW generators.

See also

List of power stations in Mexico

References

Dams in Mexico
Hydroelectric power stations in Mexico
Concrete-face rock-fill dams
Dams completed in 1993
Dams on the Río Grande de Santiago
1994 establishments in Mexico
Energy infrastructure completed in 1994
Buildings and structures in Nayarit